Minuscule 502 (in the Gregory-Aland numbering), 589 (in the Scrivener's numbering), ε 245 (in the Soden numbering), is a Greek minuscule manuscript of the New Testament, on parchment. It was adapted for liturgical use. Palaeographically it has been assigned to the 12th century. 
It was adapted for liturgical use.

Description 

The codex contains the text of the four Gospels on 235 parchment leaves (size ) with only one lacuna (Matthew 1:1-8:5). The text is written in one column per page, 22 lines per page.

There is also a division according to the Ammonian Sections, with references to the Eusebian Canons (written at the margin below Ammonian Section numbers).

Text 

The Greek text of the codex is a representative of the Byzantine text-type. Hermann von Soden included it to the textual family Kx. Aland placed it in Category V.

According to the Claremont Profile Method it represents textual family Kx in Luke 1 and Luke 20. In Luke 10 no profile was made. It belongs also to the textual cluster 74.

History 

It is dated by the INTF to the 12th century.

The manuscript was written by one Leo. Formerly it belonged to the monastery of St. Maximus. In 1853 it was bought together with Minuscule 503 from Constantine Simonides.

It was added to the list of New Testament manuscripts by F. H. A. Scrivener (589) and C. R. Gregory (502).

It was examined by Bloomfield, Scrivener, and Gregory (in 1883).

According to Gregory it could be written by the same hand as Minuscule 644.

It is currently housed at the British Library (Add MS 19387) in London.

See also 

 List of New Testament minuscules
 Biblical manuscript
 Textual criticism

References

Further reading 

 

Greek New Testament minuscules
12th-century biblical manuscripts
British Library additional manuscripts